Bezbozhnik (translation of the name: «The Godless») was an illustrated magazine, an organ of the Centre Soviet and Moscow Oblast Soviet of the League of the Militant Godless.

The magazine was published in Moscow from March 1925 to June 1941. From 1926 to 1932, the magazine was published twice a month. In other years, the magazine was published once a month. From 1926 to 1932, the editor-in-chief of the magazine was Y. M. Yaroslavsky. From 1933 to 1941, the editor-in-chief of the magazine was F. M. Putintsev. The magazine was designed for the mass working reader. On its pages articles, essays, fictional works were printed. The magazine criticized religion from the point of view of Marxism. In addition, the magazine covered the experience of the atheistic work of the cells of the League of the Militant Godless. The magazine included works by cartoonists N. F. Denisovsky, M. M. Cheremnykh, D. S. Moor, K. S. Eliseev and others. The circulation of the magazine «Bezbozhnik» reached 200 thousand copies.

See also 

 Bezbozhnik (newspaper)
 Bezbozhnik u Stanka
 Derevenskiy Bezbozhnik
 Council for Religious Affairs
 Persecutions of the Catholic Church and Pius XII
 Persecution of Christians in the Soviet Union
 Persecution of Muslims in the former USSR
 Religion in the Soviet Union
 State atheism
 USSR anti-religious campaign (1928–1941)

References

Notes
 

«Православие : Словарь атеиста» / [Беленкин И. Ф. и др.]. / Под общей редакцией доктора философских наук  Н. С. Гордиенко/  - М. : Политиздат, 1988. - 270,[2] с.; 17 см.;  / С. 34
 Атеистический словарь / [Абдусамедов А. И., Алейник Р. М., Алиева Б. А. и др. ; под общ. ред. М. П. Новикова]. - 2-е изд., испр. и доп. - Москва : Политиздат, 1985. - 512 с.; 20 см / С. 51
 Безбожник / Православная энциклопедия / Т. 4, С. 444-445

Magazines established in 1925
1941 disestablishments in the Soviet Union
Magazines published in Moscow
1925 establishments in the Soviet Union
Magazines disestablished in 1941
Monthly magazines published in Russia
Atheism publications
Magazines published in the Soviet Union
Russian-language magazines
Propaganda in the Soviet Union
Anti-religious campaign in the Soviet Union
Anti-Christian sentiment in Europe
Anti-Christian sentiment in Asia
Propaganda newspapers and magazines
Persecution of Muslims
Religious persecution by communists
Anti-Islam sentiment in the Soviet Union